NES commonly refers to the Nintendo Entertainment System, a video game console.

Nes or NES may also refer to:

Education
 National Education Service, a proposal for the United Kingdom
 New Economic School, in Russia
 New English School (Jordan)
 New English School (Kuwait)
 NHS Education for Scotland, the educational wing of NHS Scotland

Places

Faroe Islands
 Nes, Eysturoy, a village in Nes Municipality on the island of Eysturoy
 Nes Municipality, a municipality on the island of Eysturoy
 Nes, Vágur, a village in Vágur municipality on the island of Suðuroy

Norway
 Nes, the former name of Nesbyen (municipality), a municipality in Viken county
 Nes, Bjugn, a village in Ørland municipality in Trøndelag county
 Nes, Fosen, a former municipality in the old Sør-Trøndelag county
 Nes, Innlandet, a former municipality in the old Hedmark county
 Nes, Hole, a village in Hole municipality in Viken county
 Nes, Vest-Agder, a former municipality in the old Vest-Agder county
 Nes, Vestland, a village in Luster municipality in Vestland county
 Nes, Viken, a municipality in Viken county
 Nes, Ådal, a village in Ringerike municipality in Viken county
 Nes Church (disambiguation)

Netherlands
 Nes, Ameland, a village in the municipality of Ameland 
 Nes (Amsterdam), an old street in central Amsterdam
 Nes, Heerenveen, a village in the municipality of Heerenveen
 Nes, Dongeradeel, a village in the municipality of Dongeradeel
 Nes (Schagen), a village in the municipality of Schagen 
 Nes aan de Amstel, a village in the municipality of Amstelveen 
 De Nes, a village in the municipality of Texel

Russia
 Nes, Russia, a village in Nenets Autonomous Okrug

Syria
 Rojava, officially the Autonomous Administration of North and East Syria (NES), a de facto autonomous region

Science and technology
 Nes (fish), a genus of gobies in subfamily Gobiinae
 Natural evolution strategies, a method for numerical optimization
 Natural Earth satellite, a natural satellite of Earth, such as the moon
 Nestin (protein), a human gene and protein
 Nintendo Entertainment System, early computer gaming system launched in 1983 in Japan and 1985 in North America.
 Nuclear export signal, an amino acid sequence causing a protein to be exported from the nucleus to the cytoplasm
 Night eating syndrome, an eating disorder
 Netscape Enterprise Server, the former name of the Sun Java System Web Server

Organisations
 Nashville Electric Service, power provider for Nashville, Tennessee
 National Energy Systems, a former name of Eco Marine Power
 Neurootological and Equilibriometric Society, a German medical society
 New England Southern Railroad, which formerly used reporting mark NES, now NEGS
 Voter News Service, also known as News Election Service

People
 Aert Jansse van Nes (1626–1693), Dutch naval commander, brother of Jan
 Eeke van Nes (born 1969), Dutch rower
 Hadriaan van Nes (born 1942), Dutch rower
 Jan Jansse van Nes (1631–1680), Dutch admiral, brother of Aert
 Johan van Nes (died 1650), Dutch Golden Age painter
 Nuno Espírito Santo (born 1974), Portuguese footballer and coach

Other uses
 National Election Studies, an academic survey performed after every US election by the University of Michigan
 National Equality Standard, an initiative created by EY
 New Economic System, East German economic policy

See also
 NESOI (Not Elsewhere Specified or Indicated), used in categorizing cargo items
 Ness (disambiguation)